Baloqlu (also Romanized as Bāloqlū; also known as Baloqlu) is a village in Aq Kahriz Rural District, Nowbaran District, Saveh County, Markazi Province, Iran. At the 2006 census, its population was 1,331, in 396 families.

Gallery

References 

Populated places in Saveh County